René Desroches (23 December 1905 – 4 June 1990) was a French middle-distance runner. He competed in the men's 3000 metres steeplechase at the 1936 Summer Olympics.

References

1905 births
1990 deaths
Athletes (track and field) at the 1936 Summer Olympics
French male middle-distance runners
French male steeplechase runners
Olympic athletes of France
Place of birth missing
20th-century French people